The Hole of Horcum is a section of the valley of the Levisham Beck, upstream of Levisham and Lockton, in the Tabular Hills of the North York Moors National Park in northern England.

Etymology
Early forms of the name include Hotcumbe, Holcumbe, Horcombe and Horkome. The first element of the name is Old English horh, meaning "filth," while the suffix, cumb, means "bowl-shaped valley", and is of Brittonic Celtic origin.

The Hole
The Hole was created by a process called spring-sapping, where water welling up from the hillside gradually undermined the slopes above, eating the rocks away grain by grain. In this way, over thousands of years, a once narrow valley widened and deepened into an enormous cauldron. The process continues today.

Legend
Local legend has it that the "Devil's Punchbowl"-type feature, the amphitheatre, was formed when Wade the Giant scooped up a handful of earth to throw at his wife during an argument.

Panoramic view

References

Valleys of the North York Moors